Chomętowo  (formerly ) is a village in the administrative district of Gmina Brzeżno, within Świdwin County, West Pomeranian Voivodeship, in north-western Poland.

References

Villages in Świdwin County